Jack Lemmon and Walter Matthau were a pair of American male actors in the 20th century, who starred in ten films together, co-starring in eight of them. In addition, Lemmon directed Kotch (1971), which starred Matthau (and had an uncredited cameo by Lemmon). Off-screen, they were best friends, though they constantly clashed on-screen.

Films together
 The Fortune Cookie (1966)
 The Odd Couple (1968)
 Kotch (1971)
 The Front Page (1974)
 Buddy Buddy (1981)
 JFK (1991)
 Grumpy Old Men (1993)
 The Grass Harp (1995)
 Grumpier Old Men (1995)
 Out to Sea (1997)
 The Odd Couple II (1998)

References

Film duos